Marcelo França Adnet (born September 5, 1981, in Rio de Janeiro) is a Brazilian actor, comedian and former VJ. He has been on many TV shows such as Adnet viaja ("Adnet travels") (2012), Adnet ao vivo ("Adnet live") (2011) and Comédia MTV ("MTV Comedy") (2010-2012). He was named by Época Magazine one of the 100 most influential Brazilians in 2009.

Adnet holds a degree in journalism at PUC-Rio, but his career as a comedian began while in college when a friend, the actor Fernando Caruso, invited him to make an improvisation play, Z.E. Zenas Emprovisadas, which debuted in 2003 and its last season was in 2012. He stands out for the imitations he often creates around famous personalities. He worked on Multishow cable television channel, owned by Rede Globo, before going to MTV as a result of his performance in Rockgol. Marcelo was married to his former co-worker, MTV, VJ and comedian Dani Calabresa. In January 2013, Adnet was officially hired by TV Globo.

Filmography

Films

References 

Brazilian male comedians
People from Rio de Janeiro (city)
1981 births
Living people